Lords of Creation is a science fiction novel by American author Eando Binder (combined pseudonym for American brothers Earl and Otto Binder). It was first published in book form in 1949 by Prime Press in an edition of 2,112 copies, of which 112 were signed, numbered and slipcased.  The novel was originally serialized in six parts in the magazine Argosy beginning September 23, 1939.

Plot summary
Homer Ellory awakes in the year 5000 AD after sleeping for 3,000 years and discovers the Earth in a state of barbarism.  He befriends the people of North America who have been conquered by the Antarkans.  Ellory leads a revolt, but is captured by the Antarkans, imprisoned in the Antarkan city of Lillamra and sentenced to death. The Lady Ermaine falls in love with him and enables his escape.  He returns to North America, where he leads a second revolt.  After the surrender of Antarka, he is proclaimed the leader of the Earth's peoples.

Sources

1949 American novels
1949 science fiction novels
American science fiction novels
Novels first published in serial form
Works originally published in Argosy (magazine)
Works by Eando Binder